Wiwilí may refer to:

 Wiwilí de Jinotega, Nicaragua
 Wiwilí de Nueva Segovia, Nicaragua